Richard Cameron Freeman (December 14, 1926 – August 22, 1999) was a United States district judge of the United States District Court for the Northern District of Georgia.

Education and career

Born in Atlanta, Georgia, Freeman was a private in the United States Army toward the end of World War II, from 1945 to 1946. He received an Artium Baccalaureus degree from Emory University in 1950 and a Bachelor of Laws from Emory University School of Law in 1952. He was a claims manager for the Life Insurance Company of Georgia in Atlanta from 1951 to 1954, and was in private practice in Atlanta from 1952 to 1971. He was also a member of the Atlanta Board of Aldermen from 1962 to 1971.

Federal judicial service

On March 3, 1971, Freeman was nominated by President Richard Nixon to a new seat on the United States District Court for the Northern District of Georgia created by 84 Stat. 294. He was confirmed by the United States Senate on April 21, 1971, and received his commission on April 23, 1971. He assumed senior status on December 31, 1991, serving in that capacity until his death on August 22, 1999, in Atlanta.

References

Sources
 

1926 births
1999 deaths
Judges of the United States District Court for the Northern District of Georgia
United States district court judges appointed by Richard Nixon
20th-century American judges
United States Army soldiers
United States Army personnel of World War II